Orlin Ninov (born 27 June 1970) is a Bulgarian rower. He competed in the men's coxless pair event at the 1996 Summer Olympics.

References

1970 births
Living people
Bulgarian male rowers
Olympic rowers of Bulgaria
Rowers at the 1996 Summer Olympics
Sportspeople from Plovdiv